Tsez may refer to:

Tsez language
Tsez people